The German horn is a brass instrument made of tubing wrapped into a coil with a flared bell, and in bands and orchestras is the most widely used of three types of horn, the other two being the French horn (in the less common, narrower meaning of the term) and the Vienna horn. Its use among professional players has become so universal that it is only in France and Vienna that any other kind of horn is used today. A musician who plays the German horn is called a horn player (or less frequently, a hornist). The word "German" is used only to distinguish this instrument from the now-rare French and Viennese instruments. Although the expression "French horn" is still used colloquially in English for any orchestral horn (German, French, or Viennese), since the 1930s professional musicians and scholars have generally avoided this term in favour of just "horn". Vienna horns today are played only in Vienna, and are made only by Austrian firms. German horns, by contrast, are not all made by German manufacturers (e.g., Paxman in London; Conn in the US), nor are all French-style instruments made in France (e.g., Reynolds, during the 1940s and 50s in the US).

Name
The name "German horn" is used to distinguish this instrument from other, similar types of orchestral horn, such as the French horn (in the sense of the type of instrument designed by French makers and favoured by French players) and the Vienna horn. The adjective is normally omitted when referring to the instrument, which in colloquial usage is sometimes confusingly referred to as the "French" horn. The added word "French" is still found in some tutors and instrumental books, but is now regarded as a colloquialism, having passed out of the usage of composers, scholars, and professional players since about 1930 because of the increasing ubiquity of the German horn. Since that time, the true French horn's use has been confined mainly to France, and even in that country the German horn was already gaining favour with some French players as early as 1938.

History
In the late seventeenth century, French makers became preeminent in the manufacture of hunting horns, and were credited with the creation of the now-familiar, circular "hoop" shape of the instrument. As a result, even in England these instruments were often referred to by their French names, trompe de chasse or cor de chasse (the clear modern distinction between trompes—trumpets—and cors—horns—did not exist at that time).  When, early in the eighteenth century, crooks were invented in order to make such horns playable in different keys, they were first devised by German makers. Since these new instruments (which had appeared as early as 1704) were also popularized in England starting in the 1730s by the playing of the sons and grandsons of German emigrant Nicholas Jacob Christopher Messing, the national designators "French" and "German" came to be used to distinguish the simple hunting horn from the newer horn with crooks, which was also called by the Italian name corno cromatico.

The national rivalry between French and German makers continued into the era of the valved horn. Although French designs for brass-instrument valves exist from as early as 1815, a design incorporating the use of valves on the horn was first patented in 1818 by the German makers Heinrich Stölzel and Friedrich Blümel. The French followed by about 1839 with a rival design, using the piston valves perfected by François Périnet.

By the middle of the 19th century the most common type of single F horn was the German horn, with three rotary valves and a centrally placed slide crook. This instrument remained the dominant type of orchestral horn until the 1920s, by which time it had been supplanted by the (also German) double horn, introduced in 1897 by Fritz Kruspe of Erfurt. The French horn, using either two or three piston valves (also called Périnet valves after their inventor) and with crooks inserted at the mouthpipe end, continued to be preferred by many British orchestral players until the 1930s. By the mid-1940s, however, the German horn was achieving dominance in the UK. The last great British exponent of the French instrument was Dennis Brain who, even after the Second World War continued to favour the purer tone of his 1818 Raoux single horn until finally abandoning it for a four-valved B/A Alexander model 90 in October 1951. Though he did not like the sound as much, he said he "was paid to get the notes" and the German horn was "virtually foolproof" in contrast to the French horn. His father, Aubrey Brain, also a celebrated horn player and lifelong champion of the French style of instrument, declared that his son had given up the horn altogether.

By the 1990s even players in France were turning to the darker-toned German instrument.

Construction

German horns have lever-operated rotary valves, The term French horn was another name for this same horn, and the Vienna horn which uses double-piston valves, or pumpenvalves. A horn without valves is known as a natural horn, changing pitch along the natural harmonics of the instrument. Pitch may also be controlled by the position of the hand in the bell, in effect reducing the bell's diameter. The pitch of any note can easily be raised or lowered by adjusting the hand position in the bell.

Three valves control the flow of air in the single horn, which is tuned to F or nowadays with increasing frequency among first (or "high") horn players in B. The more common double horn has a fourth valve, usually operated by the thumb, which routes the air to one set of tubing tuned to F or another tuned to B. Triple horns with five valves are also made, tuned in F, B, and a descant E or F. Also common are "descant" doubles, which typically provide B and high-F branches. This configuration provides a high-range horn while avoiding the additional complexity and weight of a triple.

Character
The sound and playing character of the German horn is distinctly different from those of the French model (the instrument of Franck, Debussy and Ravel), which is smaller in volume and regarded as more refined. The tone of the German horn is warm, rich, and dark in contrast to the French horn, which is light, brilliant, and open.

Types
German horns may be classified as single, double, compensating double, and triple horns.

Single horn

It had three rotary valves and was fitted with a slide-crook which also served as a master tuning slide. The German horn had a broader bell than the "French" single horn and was played using a conical mouthpiece with a flat-edged rim. After about 1847, the French generally used an "ascending" third valve which normally sends the air through the extra length of the valve slide but, when, depressed, cuts out the slide instead of adding it as in the German horn and older French horns. Single horns use a single set of tubes connected to the valves. This allows for simplicity of use and a much lighter weight. They are usually in the keys of F or B, although many F horns have longer slides to tune them to E, and most B horns have a fourth valve to put them in the key of A. The problem with single horns is the inevitable choice between accuracy or tone. While the F horn has the "typical" horn sound, above third-space C accuracy is a concern for the majority of players because, by its nature, one plays high in the horn's harmonic series where the overtones are closer together. This led to the development of the B horn, which, although easier to play accurately, has a less desirable sound in the mid and especially the low register where it is not able to play all of the notes. The solution has been the development of the double horn, which combines the two into one horn with a single lead pipe and bell. Both main types of single horns are still used today as student models because they are cheaper and lighter than double horns. In addition, the single B horns are sometimes used in solo and chamber performances and the single F survives orchestrally as the Vienna horn. Additionally, single F alto and B alto descants are used in the performance of some baroque horn concertos and F, B, and F-alto (an octave above the usual F horn) singles are occasionally used by jazz performers.

Dennis Brain's benchmark recordings of the Mozart Horn Concerti were made on a single B/A instrument by Alexander Brothers, now on display at the Royal Academy of Music in London.

Double horn

Despite the introduction of valves, the single F horn proved difficult for use in the highest range, where the partials grew closer and closer, making accuracy a great challenge. An early solution was simply to use a single horn of higher pitch—usually in B. Late in the nineteenth century a new design was worked out by the German horn maker Ed. Kruspe (namesake of his family's brass instrument firm), in collaboration with a nephew of the horn player F. A. Gumbert, who introduced a prototype of the "double horn" in Markneukirchen in 1897. The French maker Pierre Louis Gautrot, in the meantime, had been experimenting along similar lines from 1858 onwards. In 1864 he patented his "système équitonique", originally conceived not for the horn but rather as a "compensating system" to correct the intonation of the lowest notes of the euphonium and the bombardon. It was eventually applied also to the horn, but the extra weight and cost proved excessive. Although the French firm Jérôme Thibouville-Lamy in about 1928 introduced a piston-valved double-horn with ascending third valve, designed in collaboration with the horn player Louis Vuillermoz, the double horn has continued to be identified mainly as a German horn.

The double horn essentially combines two instruments into a single frame: one horn in F, and a second, higher horn keyed in B. Like the single horn it has three valves, but each has a double set of tubing, the first tuned in F and a shorter set in B. By depressing a fourth valve (usually operated by the thumb), the horn player can quickly switch from the deep, warm tones of the F horn to the higher, brighter tones of the B horn. The two sets of tones are commonly called "sides" of the horn. Using the fourth valve not only changes the basic length (and thus the harmonic series and pitch) of the instrument, it also causes the three main valves to use proportionate slide lengths. Other double-horn combinations have also been made, for example with the F side above the B side, an octave higher than the usual F horn, and "double B" and "double F" horns, each with the two sides an octave apart.

In the twentieth century German horn makers devised further variations on the double-horn pattern. One of these was the "omnitonic" horn invented by Hermann Prager in 1918 and built by Knopf of Markneukirchen, but its complicated mechanism made the instrument very heavy. A more successful model which added a valve to lower both sides of the instrument by a semitone (from B to A and from F to E) was patented by Paul Geyer of Schwerin in 1924. The extra valve not only made playing difficult passages in sharp keys easier, but also acted as a "compensating" mechanism for the otherwise sharp pitch of stopped notes on the B side.

In the United States, the two most common styles ("wraps") of double horns are named Kruspe and Geyer/Knopf, after the German instrument makers who first developed and standardized them. The Kruspe wrap locates the B change valve above the first valve, near the thumb. The Geyer wrap has the change valve behind the third valve, near the little finger (although the valve's trigger is still played with the thumb). In effect, the air flows in a completely different direction in the two models. Kruspe-wrap horns tend to be larger in the bell throat than the Geyer-wrap horns. Typically, Kruspe models are constructed from nickel silver (also called German silver), while Geyer horns tend to be of yellow brass. Both models have their own strengths and weaknesses, and while the choice of instrument is very personal, an orchestral horn section is usually found to have either one or the other, owing to the differences in tone color, response, and projection of the two different styles.

In Europe the most popular German horns are arguably those made by Alexander Brothers of Mainz and by Paxman in London. In Germany and the Benelux countries, the Alexander 103 is extremely popular. These horns do not fit strictly into the Kruspe or Knopf camps, but have features of both. Alexander prefers the traditional medium bell size, which they have produced for many years, whereas Paxman offer their models in a range of bell throat sizes. In the United States, the Conn 8D, a mass-produced instrument based on the Kruspe design, has been extremely popular in many areas (New York, Los Angeles, Cleveland, Philadelphia). Since roughly the early 1990s, however, for reasons ranging from changing tastes to a general dislike of Conn's newer 8Ds, orchestras have been moving away from the popular Conn 8D. Geyer model horns (by Carl Geyer, Karl Hill, Keith Berg, Steve Lewis, Jerry Lechniuk, Dan Rauch, and Ricco-Kuhn) are used in other areas (San Francisco, Chicago, Pittsburgh, Boston, Houston). The CF Schmidt double, with its unique piston change valve, is occasionally found in sections playing Geyer/Knopf model equipment.

Compensating double horn
The first design of the double horn did not have a separate set of slides pitched in F. Rather, the main key of the horn was B (the preference of German horn players) and it could be played in F by directing air through the B slides, an F extension, and another set of smaller slides. This "compensated" for the longer length of the F slides, producing a horn now called the compensating double. It was, and still is, widely used by European horn players because of its light weight and ease of playing, especially in the high register.

Triple horn
In the second half of the twentieth century the principle of the German double horn was extended by adding yet another "side" to create the triple horn. This design was developed by the horn player Richard Merewether and the London firm of Paxman to afford the player even more security in the high register. One variation adds to the F and B horns a third, descant horn in high F, an octave above the normal F horn, though it may alternatively be pitched in B. It is activated through the use of a second thumb valve. The triple horn was met with considerable resistance when it first appeared. Horn players were reluctant to spend far more money for a triple horn than they would for a double horn, and they were much heavier than the average double horn. Players noted that their arms became fatigued much faster. Moreover, the combination of three different horns creates issues with sonority, because the piping shared among all three sides (that is, the lead pipe and bell) are mathematically disproportionate to two or all three horn lengths. Horn makers have had to make concessions to "even out" the sound between all three, often to the loss of sound quality of each side or entire ranges of the instrument. Advances in horn production are gradually eliminating these drawbacks, and the triple horn is gaining popularity. They are rarely available in anything lower than professional quality. Like double horns, triple horns can come in both full and compensating wraps. Today they are found being played in many professional orchestras, although the substantial cost difference between double and triple horns limits their usage elsewhere.

Related horns

The variety in horn history necessitates consideration of the natural horn, French horn, Vienna horn, mellophone, marching horn, and Wagner tuba.

Natural horn

The natural horn is the ancestor of the modern horn. It is essentially descended from hunting horns, with its pitch controlled by air speed, aperture (opening of the lips through which air passes) and the use of the right hand moving in and out of the bell. Today it is played as a period instrument. The natural horn can only play from a single harmonic series at a time because there is only one length of tubing available to the horn player. A proficient player can indeed alter the pitch by partially muting the bell with the right hand, thus enabling the player to reach some notes that are not part of the instrument's natural harmonic series—of course this technique also affects the quality of the tone. The player has a choice of key by using crooks to change the length of tubing.

French horn

The French horn (when the name is used specifically for a horn type) in modern use is a narrow-bore horn with three Périnet (piston) valves. It retains the narrow bell-throat and  mouthpipe crooks of the orchestral hand horn of the late eighteenth century, and most often has an "ascending" third valve. This is a whole-tone valve arranged so that with the valve in the "up" position the valve loop is engaged, but when the valve is pressed the loop is cut out, raising the pitch by a whole tone. Some early examples had only two valves, and on others the valve section, called the sauterelle, could be removed and replaced by a simple main tuning slide and coupling tubes, allowing the instrument to be played as a natural horn.

Vienna horn

The Vienna horn is a special horn used primarily in Vienna, Austria. Instead of using rotary valves or piston valves, it uses the pumpenvalve (or Vienna valve), which is a double-piston operating inside the valve slides, and usually situated on the opposite side of the corpus from the player's left hand, and operated by a long pushrod. Unlike the German horn, which has grown considerably larger internally (for a bigger, broader, and louder tone), and considerably heavier (with the addition of valves and tubing in the case of the double horn) the Vienna horn very closely mimics the size and weight of the natural horn, (although the valves do add some weight, they are lighter than rotary valves) even using crooks in the front of the horn, between the mouthpiece and the instrument. The bore of the Vienna horn is even smaller than that of the French horn, averaging only . Vienna horn players use a conical F crook inserted at the mouthpipe end. Vienna horns are often used with funnel shaped mouthpieces similar to those used on the natural horn, with very little (if any) backbore and a very thin rim. The Viennese horn requires very specialized technique and can be quite challenging to play, even for accomplished players of modern horns. The Vienna horn has a warmer, softer sound than the modern horn. Its pumpenvalves facilitate a continuous transition between notes (glissando); conversely, a more precise operating of the valves is required to avoid notes that sound out of tune.

Mellophone

Two instruments are called a mellophone. The first is an instrument shaped somewhat like a horn, in that it is formed in a circle. It has piston valves and is played with the right hand on the valves. Manufacturing of this instrument sharply decreased in the middle of the twentieth century, and this mellophone (or mellophonium) rarely appears today.

The second instrument is used in modern brass bands and marching bands, and is more accurately called a "marching mellophone" or simply "mellophone". A derivative of the F alto horn, it is usually keyed in F, occasionally in G. It is shaped like a flugelhorn, with piston valves played with the right hand and a forward-pointing bell. These horns are generally considered better marching instruments than regular horns because their position is more stable on the mouth, they project better, and they weigh less. It is primarily used as the middle voice of drum and bugle corps. Though they are usually played with a V-cup cornet-like mouthpiece, their range overlaps the common playing range of the horn. This mouthpiece switch makes the mellophone louder, less mellow, and more brassy and brilliant, making it more appropriate for marching bands. Often now with the use of converters, traditional conical horn mouthpieces are used to achieve the more mellow sound of a horn to make the marching band sound more like a concert band.

As they are pitched in F or G and their range overlaps that of the horn, mellophones can be used in place of the horn in brass and marching band settings. Mellophones are, however, sometimes unpopular with horn players because the mouthpiece change can be difficult and requires a different embouchure. Because the bore is more cylindrical than the orchestral horn the "feel" of the mellophone can be foreign to a horn player. Another unfamiliar aspect of the mellophone is that it is designed to be played with the right hand instead of the left (although it can be played with the left). Intonation can also be an issue when playing the mellophone.

In orchestral or concert band settings, regular concert horns are normally preferred to mellophones because of their tone, which blends better with woodwinds and strings, and their greater intonational subtlety—since the player can adjust the tuning by hand. For these reasons, mellophones are played more usually in marching bands and brass band ensembles, occasionally in jazz bands, and almost never in orchestral or concert band settings.

While horn players may be asked to play the mellophone, it is unlikely that the instrument was ever intended as a substitute for the horn, mainly because of the fundamental differences described. As an instrument, it compromises between the ability to sound like a horn and a playing position like a trumpet or flugelhorn, a tradeoff that sacrifices acoustic properties for ergonomics.

Marching horn
The marching horn is similar to the mellophone in shape and appearance, but is pitched in the key of B (the same as the B side of a regular double horn). It is also available in F alto (one octave above the F side of a regular double horn). The marching horn is also normally played with a horn mouthpiece (unlike the mellophone, which needs an adapter to fit the horn mouthpiece). These instruments are primarily used in marching bands so that the sound comes from a forward-facing bell, as dissipation of the sound from the backward-facing bell becomes a concern in open-air environments. Many college marching bands and drum corps prefer mellophones, which better balance the tone of the other brass instruments.

Wagner tuba

The Wagner tuba is a rare brass instrument that is essentially a horn modified to have a larger bell throat and a vertical bell. Like the German horn, it uses rotary valves. Despite its name, it is not considered part of the tuba family. Invented for Richard Wagner specifically for his work Der Ring des Nibelungen, it has been used subsequently by other composers, including Bruckner, Stravinsky and Richard Strauss. It uses a horn mouthpiece and is available as a single tuba in B or F, or, more recently, as a double tuba similar to the double horn. Its common range is similar to that of the euphonium, but its possible range is the same as that of the horn, extending from low F, below the bass clef staff to high C above the treble staff when read in F. These low pedals are substantially easier to play on the Wagner tuba than on the horn.

Repertory

When writing for the horn, composers rarely specify the particular type of instrument (natural, French, German, or Vienna), but the ubiquity of the German horn means that this is the type of instrument most often heard today in horn repertoire composed from the eighteenth century to the present.

Orchestra and concert (and military) band
The horn is most often used as an orchestral and concert-band instrument, with its singular tone being employed by composers to achieve specific effects. In the orchestral repertory, Leopold Mozart, for example, used horns to signify the hunt, as in his Jagdsinfonie (hunting symphony). Telemann wrote much for the horn, and it features prominently in the work of Handel and in Bach's Brandenburg Concerto no. 1. Once the technique of hand-stopping had been developed, allowing fully chromatic playing, composers began to write seriously for the horn. Gustav Mahler made great use of the horn's uniquely haunting and distant sound in his symphonies, notably the famous Nachtmusik (serenade) section of his Symphony No. 7. Band works with prominent horn parts include Gustav Holst's First Suite in E for Military Band.

Many composers have written works that have become favorites in the horn repertoire. These include Poulenc (Elegie) and Saint-Saëns (Morceau de Concert for horn and orchestra, op. 94 and Romance, op. 36). Others, particularly Wolfgang Amadeus Mozart, whose friend Joseph Leutgeb was a noted horn player, wrote extensively for the instrument, including concerti and other solo works. Mozart's A Musical Joke satirizes the limitations of contemporary horn playing, including the risk of selecting the wrong crook by mistake.

The development of the valve horn was exploited by romantic composers such as Bruckner, Mahler, and Richard Strauss, whose father was a well-known professional horn player. Strauss's Till Eulenspiegel's Merry Pranks contains one of the best known horn solos from this period, relying on the chromatic facility of the valved horn. Brahms had a lifelong love for the instrument, with many prominently featured parts throughout his four symphonies.

Solo repertory
In the eighteenth century some outstanding concertos were written for solo horn and orchestra by Telemann, Christoph Förster, Michael and Joseph Haydn, Leopold and Wolfgang Amadeus Mozart, and Carl Stamitz. Concerti grossi include concertos for two horns by Vivaldi and Bach’s First Brandenburg Concerto. At the end of the century Beethoven composed a Sonata for Horn and Piano in F major, Op. 17, for the Bohemian virtuoso Giovanni Punto (Jan Václav Stich), a master of hand-horn technique.

In the early nineteenth century, Carl Maria von Weber, in addition to giving the horn a prominent orchestral place in the overtures to the operas Oberon and Der Freischütz, composed a spectacularly difficult Concertino in E Minor which, amongst other things, includes an early use of multiphonics, produced by humming into the instrument while playing. Gioachino Rossini exploited the instrument's association with hunting in a piece called Rendez-vous de chasse for four corni da caccia and orchestra (1828). All of these works were written for the natural horn.

The advent of the valved horn brought new possibilities, which were exploited by Robert Schumann in two works written in 1849: the Adagio and Allegro for horn and piano Op. 70 and the Concertstück for four horns and orchestra. Other important works from this era are the concertos by Saverio Mercadante, Franz Strauss, and the First Concerto (1882–83) by his son Richard Strauss. Camille Saint-Saëns did not write a concerto as such, but did compose two Romances for horn (or cello) and orchestra, Op. 67 in E major (1866), and Op. 36 in F major (1874), and a Morceau de concert Op. 94 (1887) for horn and orchestra.

Chamber music
The horn is a standard member of the wind quintet and brass quintet, and often appears in other configurations. Notable works from the late-eighteenth and early nineteenth centuries include two quintets by Mozart, one in E major for horn, violin, two violas, and cello (KV407/386c) and the other for piano, oboe, clarinet, bassoon and horn (KV452). Beethoven also wrote a Quintet  for piano and winds, Op. 16, as well as a Sextet for two horns and strings, Op. 81b, and a Septet in E major, Op. 20, for clarinet, horn, bassoon, violin, viola, cello, and double bass. One of Schubert’s last works is the Octet (D803), written in 1824, which adds a second violin to Beethoven's Septet scoring.

The combination of horn with violin and piano is called a horn trio, and though Brahms's Horn Trio was not the first example, it nevertheless was the first important work in the genre and inspired many later composers to write for the same grouping, notably Lennox Berkeley (ca.1953), Don Banks (1962), and György Ligeti (1982).

Notable horn players

Gerd Seifert – 1956 winner of the ARD International Music Competition and former principal horn in Berlin Philharmonic Orchestra.
Hermann Baumann – 1964 winner of the ARD International Music Competition and former principal horn in various orchestras, including the Stuttgart Radio Symphony Orchestra.
Nobert Hauptmann – 1969 winner of the ARD International Music Competition and former principal horn in Berlin Philharmonic Orchestra.
Radek Baborak – Famous Czech horn player, former principal horn in Berlin Philharmonic Orchestra. 1994 winner of the ARD International Music Competition, Winner of the Concertino Praga in 1988 and 1990, holder of a Grammy Award (1995).
Dennis Brain – former principal horn of the Royal Philharmonic Orchestra and the Philharmonia, with whom Herbert von Karajan made well-known recordings of Mozart's horn concertos.
John Cerminaro – current principal horn of the Seattle Symphony and former principal horn of the New York Philharmonic and the Los Angeles Philharmonic.
Dale Clevenger – former principal horn of the Chicago Symphony Orchestra (1966–2013).
Vincent DeRosa – former principal horn for a number of Hollywood studios and composers including John Williams.
Richard Dunbar – a player of the French horn, playing in the free jazz scene.
Philip Farkas – former principal horn of the Chicago Symphony Orchestra, developer of the Holton-Farkas horn and author of several books on horn and brass playing.
Douglas Hill – former principal horn of the Madison Symphony Orchestra. notable teacher and composer
Philip Myers – principal horn of the New York Philharmonic since 1980.
Jeff Nelsen – Canadian Brass hornist since 2000 and Indiana University Jacobs School of Music horn faculty since 2006.
David Pyatt – winner of the BBC Young Musician of the Year competition in 1988 and current principal horn of the London Symphony Orchestra.
Gunther Schuller – former principal horn of the Cincinnati Symphony Orchestra and Metropolitan Opera Orchestra and played with Miles Davis.
Barry Tuckwell – former principal horn of the London Symphony Orchestra and author of several books on horn playing.
Radovan Vlatković – 1983 winner of the ARD International Music Competition, former principal horn and soloist of the Berlin Radio Symphony Orchestra and professor at the Mozarteum University of Salzburg.
William VerMeulen – Internationally renown horn soloist and former principal horn of Honolulu Symphony Orchestra current principal horn of the Houston Symphony Orchestra and professor at Rice University reputed to have the highest placement rating of his students in American Orchestras.
Stefan Dohr – current principal horn, Berlin Philharmonic Orchestra
Stefan de Leval Jezierski – longest serving horn, Berlin Philharmonic Orchestra
Sarah Willis - First female brass player of the Berlin Philharmonic Orchestra

Notes

References
 
 
 
 
 
 
 
 
 
 
 

 [Third edition was published in 2006 by Cengage Learning, ]

External links

Homepage of the International Horn Society, one of the largest organizations of horn players in the world.
British Horn Society, UK-based organisation for horn playing
First steps of making a horn by hand (QuickTime Movie) at Finke Horns
Horn maintenance  at Paxman, compiled with the assistance of Simon de Souza
How to dismantle a valve at Finke Horns
Horn Etudes -  List of horn etudes

F instruments
B-flat instruments
German musical instruments
Horns